John Philip Glen (born 1 April 1974) is a British politician and former management consultant serving as Chief Secretary to the Treasury since October 2022 and Member of Parliament (MP) for Salisbury in Wiltshire since 2010. Glen is a member of the Conservative Party. Formerly Parliamentary Under-Secretary of State for Arts, Heritage and Tourism at the Department for Digital, Culture, Media and Sport, Glen served as Economic Secretary to the Treasury from January 2018 to July 2022.

Early life and career

Glen was born in Bath on 1 April 1974, and was brought up in a family horticultural business in rural Wiltshire. He was privately educated at King Edward's School, Bath, where he was head boy, and Mansfield College, Oxford, where he read modern history and was elected president of Mansfield College JCR. He was the first person in his family to go to university.

After graduating from Oxford, Glen worked for two Conservative ministers in 1996–1997. He helped with the unsuccessful campaign to get the Conservative candidate, Michael Bates, elected in the constituency of Middlesbrough South and East Cleveland at the 1997 general election. Following the election of a Labour government in 1997, he joined the strategy practice of Accenture, a large management consultancy firm. Whilst there he worked on projects for Glaxo Wellcome, BP and the Post Office. In 2000, Glen went to work for William Hague, who was then leader of the Conservative Party. In his role as head of the political section of the Conservative Research Department, he helped prepare Hague for Prime Minister's Question Time and briefed the Shadow Cabinet for media appearances.

Glen was first a parliamentary candidate at the 2001 general election, when he unsuccessfully stood in Plymouth Devonport as the Conservative candidate. He came second, achieving 27.1% of the vote and a 2.9% swing. Following the election, he took an MBA at Fitzwilliam College, Cambridge, and worked in the oil and gas industries in the UK and in the United States.

Early in 2004, he returned to the Conservative Party to work as deputy director of the Conservative Research Department in the run-up to the 2005 general election. He then became director of the department and set up the secretariat for the policy review that was established after David Cameron became party leader. He returned to business in 2006, managing his firm's relationship with the World Economic Forum. He became a magistrate (JP) at Horseferry Road, Westminster in 2006.

Parliamentary career
Glen was elected as the Member of Parliament (MP) for Salisbury at the 2010 general election. A safe Conservative seat, his percentage share of the vote showed an increase over the previous election in 2005.

In 2010, Glen was criticised for being one of eight MPs claiming public expenses to rent houses or pay for hotel rooms in London, despite already owning homes in the capital that the MPs rented out to provide themselves with additional income. The practice was entirely legal.

Glen was criticised in April 2012 by campaigners for employing an intern from a charity that had recently sponsored an event where a "cure" for homosexuality was discussed. Glen argued that the views expressed at the conference were those of one specific lecturer and were not advocated by the charity more generally.

In the September 2012 reshuffle, he was appointed Parliamentary Private Secretary to Eric Pickles, Secretary of State for Communities and Local Government. He was succeeded by Henry Smith in May 2015.

On 31 January 2013, Glen published a paper titled "Completing the Reform, Freeing the Universities" as a member of the Free Enterprise Group of MPs. The paper advocated encouraging universities to build up endowments, which could then replace income from grants; reforms to the tuition fee cap towards "total course costs" instead of per-year caps, and allowing fee differentials by subject group; changes to the way in which research funding is allocated; and administrative savings by the Research Councils and the Office of Fair Access. He wrote an op-ed for the Daily Telegraph about the policies advocated in the paper, titled "Tuition fees cannot be the last reform of university funding". 

In June 2013, Glen joined the Delete Blood Cancer register at an event in parliament. Despite the 1 in 1200 chance of being matched with a cancer sufferer, less than a year later he had been matched with a blood cancer patient. In January 2015, Glen donated his blood stem cells at The London Clinic, enabling the patient to be treated.

In 2014, he sat on the Downing Street Policy Board with responsibility for constitutional affairs. In a 2014 survey by a non-campaigning website that enables constituents to contact their MP, Glen was ranked as the second most responsive MP. In 2015 he completed an MA in international security and strategy, with distinction, at King's College London through the Royal College of Defence Studies.

He retained his seat at the 2015 election with 55.6% of the vote – an increase of 6.4% from 2010. Subsequently, he was made PPS to Business Secretary Sajid Javid.

Despite describing himself as a Eurosceptic, Glen was a "reluctant Remainer" prior to the 2016 referendum as he did not feel it was the right time for the UK to leave the European Union. He later voted to trigger Article 50.

Following Theresa May's appointment as Prime Minister in July 2016, Glen was made PPS to Chancellor of the Exchequer Philip Hammond. Following the 2017 election, Glen was appointed Parliamentary Under-Secretary of State for Arts, Heritage and Tourism.

Glen's constituency was the location of the Poisoning of Sergei and Yulia Skripal.

In the House of Commons he has sat on the Work and Pensions Committee, the Defence Committee and the Committees on Arms Export Controls (formerly Quadripartite Committee). He also sits on a number of All-party parliamentary groups (APPGs). He is the chair of the APPG on Global Uncertainties, which exists to inform parliamentarians of the activities of the UK Research Councils in response to global security challenges. He is vice-chair of the Carpet Industry APPG.

Glen played a significant contributory role in the APPG Hunger and Food Poverty's inquiry, Feeding Britain. Additionally, he is secretary for the British Council APPG which took him on a visit to Kabul, and a member of APPG Egypt and APPG Parents and Families. His website lists his further APPG memberships as: Archives and History, British Council (Appointed Secretary in 2011), British-Maldives Parliamentary Group, Complex Needs and Dual Diagnosis, Constitution, Parliament and Citizenship, Historic Churches, Malaysia, Nuclear Energy, Runaway and Missing Children and Adults, Suicide and Self Harm Prevention, and Voice UK.

On 2 September 2021 he became the longest serving Economic Secretary to the Treasury since the creation of the post in 1947.

On 6 July 2022, Glen resigned as Economic Secretary to the Treasury during the July 2022 United Kingdom government crisis.

Political views
Tim Montgomerie, former Times columnist and Editor of ConservativeHome, has described John Glen as a "full spectrum Conservative" – meaning one who is Eurosceptic and supportive of low taxation, but also concerned with social issues and the environment.

Social issues
Glen took part in the APPG on Hunger and Food Poverty inquiry, and argued in 2014 that prosperity needs to be shared, and that the Department for Work and Pensions should improve benefit payment reliability to prevent the need for foodbank use. Trussell Trust chairman Chris Mould and CEO David McAuley said that Glen "been very supportive of The Trussell Trust and has played an important role as a key member of the APPG Inquiry Panel". He welcomed the rise in the minimum wage and supports employers paying the living wage.

Ethics and religion
He is an advocate for religious education. On 5 February 2013, he voted against allowing same-sex couples to marry due to his Christian beliefs. This decision was criticised by Nick Holtam, the Bishop of Salisbury at the time. On anti-mitochondrial donation therapy, Glen described himself as "instinctively cautious about technologies that, while noble in intent, could potentially open the door to the development of 'genetically modified babies'". In 2016, he was a trustee and chairman of the Conservative Christian Fellowship, an organisation within the Conservative party.

References

External links
 
 
 UK Conservative Party profile

1974 births
Living people
People educated at King Edward's School, Bath
Alumni of Mansfield College, Oxford
Alumni of Fitzwilliam College, Cambridge
Alumni of King's College London
Chief Secretaries to the Treasury
Members of the Privy Council of the United Kingdom
Conservative Party (UK) MPs for English constituencies
UK MPs 2010–2015
UK MPs 2015–2017
UK MPs 2017–2019
UK MPs 2019–present
Free Enterprise Group